Henry Louis "Trey" Smith III (born June 16, 1999) is an American football guard for the Kansas City Chiefs of the National Football League (NFL). He played college football at Tennessee before he was drafted by the Chiefs in the sixth round of the 2021 NFL Draft.

High school career 
A native of Humboldt, Tennessee, Smith attended the University School of Jackson, where he was a three-time All-State offensive lineman.

Regarded as a five-star recruit, Smith was ranked as the No. 1 prospect overall in the class of 2017 by ESPN. He chose Tennessee over scholarship offers from Ohio State, Ole Miss, and Alabama.

College career 
In his true freshman year at Tennessee, Smith started all twelve games; first at right guard, later at left tackle. For his efforts in the 2017 season, he was named to the All-SEC Second Team.

After starting the first seven games of this sophomore season at left tackle, Tennessee's medical staff discovered blood clots in Smith's lungs and ruled him out indefinitely. The issue had originally been discovered in February 2018, before the Volunteers' spring practice but thought to have been resolved. Smith missed the remainder of the 2018 season.

Cleared to return for his junior season, Smith was moved to left guard as true freshman Wanya Morris took over as left tackle.  He was named to the All-SEC First Team. Despite some speculation that he would enter the 2020 NFL Draft, Smith announced that he would remain in Tennessee for his senior year. He started all ten games and earned first-team All-SEC honors for the Volunteers in his last season.

Professional career

Smith was drafted by the Kansas City Chiefs in the sixth round, 226th overall, of the 2021 NFL Draft. He signed his four-year rookie contract on May 13, 2021. He was named the Chiefs starting right guard immediately as a rookie. He started all 17 regular season games and three playoff games for the Chiefs as a rookie. He was named to the NFL All-Rookie Team for the 2021 season. In 2022, Smith started 16 regular season games and the Chiefs' three playoff games. Smith started at right guard in Super Bowl LVII and solidified an offensive line that gave up zero sacks in the game as the Chiefs defeated the Philadelphia Eagles 38-35.

References

External links 

 
 Kansas City Chiefs bio
 Tennessee Volunteers bio
 

1999 births
Living people
Kansas City Chiefs players
People from Humboldt, Tennessee
Players of American football from Tennessee
American football offensive linemen
Tennessee Volunteers football players